XIN is an American comic book created by Kevin Lau, published by Anarchy Studio in 2003. The main character, Xin, also known as Monkey, was based on the character Sun Wukong, from the shenmo fantasy novel Journey to the West, a Chinese literary classic written in the Ming Dynasty. XIN took many facets of the ancient tale and twists them with a modern sensibility.

See also
Anarchy Studio
Journey to the West
Monkey (TV series)
Sun Wukong

Characters created by Joe Madureira
Comics publications